Mark Deyal (born 7 April 1993) is a Trinidadian cricketer who has played for both Trinidad and Tobago and the Combined Campuses and Colleges in West Indian domestic cricket, as well as representing the Saint Lucia Kings franchise in the Caribbean Premier League (CPL).

Deyal was born in couva. He made his first-class debut for Trinidad and Tobago in the last match of the 2014–15 Regional Four Day Competition, against the Leeward Islands. Deyal subsequently signed with the Red Steel franchise for the 2015 Caribbean Premier League season. He made his debut for the team against the Jamaica Tallawahs, and scored 23 runs from 25 balls coming in sixth in the batting order. For the 2015–16 Regional Super50, Deyal switched from Trinidad and Tobago to the Combined Campuses, making his debut for the team against the Leeward Islands.

On 3 June 2018, he was selected to play for the Winnipeg Hawks in the players' draft for the inaugural edition of the Global T20 Canada tournament. In July 2020, he was named in the Saint Lucia Kings squad for the 2020 Caribbean Premier League.

References

External links
Player profile and statistics at CricketArchive
Player profile and statistics at ESPNcricinfo

1993 births
Living people
Combined Campuses and Colleges cricketers
People from Diego Martin region
Trinidad and Tobago cricketers
Trinbago Knight Riders cricketers
Trinidad and Tobago representative cricketers